Colobochyla is a genus of moths of the family Erebidae.

Taxonomy
The genus has previously been classified in the subfamily Phytometrinae of Erebidae or the subfamily Calpinae of the family Noctuidae. The genus is tentatively classified in the Hypeninae but needs further phylogenetic analysis to determine its proper subfamily placement.

Species
 Colobochyla interpuncta (Grote, 1872) – swamp belle moth, yellow-lined owlet
 Colobochyla mabillealis (Viette, 1954)
 Colobochyla platizona (Lederer, 1870)
 Colobochyla saalmuelleralis (Viette, 1954)
 Colobochyla salicalis (Denis & Schiffermüller, 1775) – lesser belle moth
 Colobochyla similis Warren, 1915

References

 Colobochyla at Markku Savela's Lepidoptera and Some Other Life Forms
 Denis & Schiffermüller (1775). Ank. Syst. Werkes Schmett. Wiener. Geg.
 Natural History Museum Lepidoptera genus database

Hypeninae
Moth genera